Clementine Abel, alias Clelie Betemann (née Clementine Hofmeister) (born and died Leipzig, Germany; 15 January 1826 – 30 November 1905) was a German writer. She wrote poems and tales especially for children and teenagers, as well as articles for newspapers.

Abel was married to book shopper Ambrosius Abel.

Works
 Meine Sonntage. Rückblicke und Erinnerungen (1882)
 An der Mutter Hand (1883)
 Sprüche, Strophen und Stimmungsbilder. Lyrisches und Didaktisches (1889)

References

1826 births
1905 deaths
19th-century German writers
German children's writers
German women children's writers
Writers from Leipzig
19th-century German women writers